Henry Chimuchem Okebugwu (born 19 June 1998) is a Nigerian footballer who currently plays as a midfielder for Turan-Tovuz in Azerbaijan Premier League.

Career statistics

Club

Notes

References

1998 births
Living people
Nigerian footballers
Nigerian expatriate footballers
Association football midfielders
Kategoria e Parë players
Kategoria Superiore players
Ifeanyi Ubah F.C. players
FK Partizani Tirana players
KS Kastrioti players
Nigerian expatriate sportspeople in Albania
Expatriate footballers in Albania
Sportspeople from Lagos